The Ontario Cannabis Retail Corporation, operating as Ontario Cannabis Store (OCS), is a Crown corporation that manages a legal monopoly over the online retail and wholesale distribution of recreational cannabis to consumers and privately operated brick and mortar retailers respectively throughout Ontario, Canada.

Founding
After the federal government announced recreational use of cannabis would be legalized in 2017 or early 2018, then Premier Kathleen Wynne commented the LCBO stores might be the ideal distribution network for stocking, controlling and selling such products. The Ontario Public Service Employees Union (OPSEU), which represents LCBO staff, also lobbied for the LCBO to have a monopoly on cannabis sales.

In response to the federal Task Force on Marijuana Legalization and Regulation recommendation against selling cannabis in conjunction with alcohol, 
in September 2017, the Ontario government announced the LCBO would be the sole vendor of recreational marijuana to the public in that province, but not through the 651 stores that sell alcoholic beverages. A new Crown corporation, the Ontario Cannabis Retail Corporation (OCRC), was established as a subsidiary of the LCBO with a mandate to initially open 40 stores before legalization took effect in October 2018. OCRC also entered a partnership with Shopify to use the company's platform for operating the province's online cannabis sales. In March 2018, OCRC adopted the trading name Ontario Cannabis Store for its retail services. The OCS logo, designed by a Canadian subsidiary of Leo Burnett Worldwide as part of a $650,000 marketing and branding contract, was derided as "boring" and "underwhelming".

Change in mandate
Following the 2018 provincial election, the new provincial government led by Premier Doug Ford announced the OCRC would not be opening physical stores and that cannabis sales in Ontario would instead be conducted by private stores. Under this new model, the OCRC continues to operate the provincial online cannabis sales service and serves as the wholesale supplier for private stores in Ontario. The Alcohol and Gaming Commission of Ontario is responsible for the regulation and licensing of private cannabis stores in province. The OCRC was also reorganized to operate directly under the Ministry of Finance rather than as a subsidiary of the LCBO.

Brick-and-mortar stores
Because of a cap on the number of retail outlets, operated by private enterprise, permits to operate cannabis stores were based on a lottery system. Only 25 licences were issued initially, and another 50 were subsequently awarded. (The government continued to operate the on-line sales business via its Ontario Cannabis Store site.) 

Ontario Attorney General Doug Downey announced in December 2019 that by April 2020, the lottery, and the cap on the number of licenses, would both be eliminated. Some 20 new ones would be issued per month. The intent was to increase the number of retail outlets in the province, and to make up for the stores which had already closed. Increasing the supply was expected to help "combat the illicit market".

Effect on black market
The black market remained persistent as of October 2019, partly because of a lack of retail outlets in many communities and because of the lower prices charged of illicit product. Illicit sales accounted for 86% of the Canadian market, with prices being 30-35% lower on average according to a report. As of September 2020, the legal market had gained ground. OCS said the legal market made up 25.1% of sales. The average price for dried flower on the OCS had fallen to $7.05 per gram after taxes, compared to the average price for illicit cannabis at $7.98 per gram. The growth is also attributed to an increase in brick-and-mortar retail, with 110 stores operating as of Q3 2020, compared to just 22 at the same time last year.

References

See also

 Cannabis in Ontario

Canadian provincial cannabis departments and agencies
Cannabis in Ontario
Crown corporations of Ontario
2017 establishments in Ontario
Cannabis shops in Canada